The Carniriv is an annual festival, held in Port Harcourt, Nigeria. The Carnival starts few weeks before Christmas, and lasts for seven days. During this time several ceremonial events are held, most of which hold some cultural and or sacred significance.

The Port Harcourt Carnival bears a certain uniqueness as it combines two carnivals - a purely cultural carnival and a contemporary Caribbean style carnival- in one. It also features musical performances from both local and international artists. This gives it an edge over all other regional and continental carnivals, and presents with the principal advantage which must be consummately exploited.

The Government of Rivers State recognizes Carniriv as its biggest tourism export. With economic interests increasingly identifying tourism as a viable alternative to the fossil fuel economy- especially in these parts- the state government has exhibited its commitment to developing this carnival into a regionally unrivalled and globally reckoned tourist attraction. Thus, it has always made available the necessary monetary backing needed for the event to hold every year, and has also worked hard through the Rivers State Tourism Development Agency and the Ministry of Culture and Tourism to see that it is held.

History
By all means, Carniriv ’88 is the direct ancestor of Carniriv: The Port Harcourt Carnival. From 1988, through to 2008, the idea of staging a carnival with statewide participation morphed in a number of forms- most notably in the form of Rivifest - until the emergence of the current carnival. Carniriv: The Port Harcourt Carnival was construed and staged in 2008; and with it came the poignant allure to build a sturdy and ultimately attractive carnival brand.

Orientation
Rivers State is known as the land of a thousand masquerades. With a fine variety of spoken tongues, numbering over 300, it is somewhat easy to discern the beauty in the diversity of its peoples. Very many civilizations, ancient and seemingly ageless as they are, quite simply draw attention to the richness and unspeakable eminence of the collective heritage of the Rivers people. Simply put, we are the microcosm of the macrocosm, a Nigeria (with all of its cultural and ethnic diversity) within Nigeria. This, to all intents and purposes, is at the core of the philosophy and guiding principle of Carniriv: The Port Harcourt Carnival.

Events

Garden City Freestyle Parade
The carnival here enters its final day, and the hype and excitement portend to a crescendo. Glamour, style and pageantry all fuse into one fine artistic blend in a contemporary modern cultural procession through the streets of Port Harcourt.
Traditionally, 6 bands participate in this procession; with 5 bands (namely: Jubilee, Liberation, Dynamic, Fusion and Treasure Bands) all wrapped-up in fervent competition.

International Heritage Parade
In true carnival style, contingents of the 23 LGAs engage a procession (on a pre-defined route) through the streets of Port Harcourt- showcasing enthralling dances and masquerade displays as they do so. All of these performances are embedded in colourful floats gigged with impressive icons. This year, the Heritage parade goes international with the inclusion of troupes from Malaysia and South Africa as honorary participants.

Kids Carnival
This Carnival is a strong reflection of the importance attached to children in Carniriv, and by extension Tourism Development, in Rivers State.

The Children’s Carnival is designed as a mini-procession, commencing at the Elekahia play-ground and culminating in the Liberation Stadium (Elekahia) - where children will be treated to a carnival full offun, refreshment, leisure and unrestrained entertainment befitting of an ice-breaker event in anticipation of the Grand opening of Carniriv 2012.

References

External links

 CARNIRIV Official Website

Music festivals in Nigeria
Festivals in Port Harcourt
Annual events in Port Harcourt
Carnivals in Nigeria
Cultural festivals in Nigeria